The g-stroke character Ǥ / ǥ is a letter of the Latin Skolt Sami alphabet, denoting the partially voiced palatal spirant (i.e., a weakly voiced velar fricative). It appears contrastively with respect to G, Ǧ, K, Ǩ, C, and Č, and typically appears phonemically geminate, e.g., viiǥǥam  "I bring". 
In Kadiweu, G with stroke is used to represent the voiced uvular stop .
The letter is also used to write Proto-Germanic, has been used to write Northern Sami (in an old orthography), and is used to represent a velar nasal in the Old Icelandic orthography proposed in the First Grammatical Treatise.

G-stroke